Arculus may refer to:

 The Roman tutelary god of chests and strongboxes (arcae); see Indigitamenta
 A crossvein near the base of the wing in certain insects; see Glossary of entomology terms
 Arculus (bivalve), a genus of the Neoleptonidae family of marine bivalve clams

People with the surname
 Sir David Arculus (born 1946), British media figure, businessman and advisor to Government
 Richard Arculus, Australian petrologist and volcanologist
 Sir Ronald Arculus (1923–2016), British ambassador

See also
 Aculus, a genus of mites
 Argulus, a genus of fish lice